The 2001–02 FA Cup qualifying rounds opened the 121st season of competition in England for 'The Football Association Challenge Cup' (FA Cup), the world's oldest association football single knockout competition. A total of 596 clubs were accepted for the competition, down six from the previous season’s 602.

The large number of clubs entering the tournament from lower down (Levels 5 through 10) in the English football pyramid meant that the competition started with six rounds of preliminary (2) and qualifying (4) knockouts for these non-League teams. Somerset Senior League and South Western Football League were the only level 10 leagues represented in the Cup, three clubs from the leagues were the lowest-ranked clubs in competition. The 32 winning teams from fourth round Qualifying progressed to the First round proper, where League teams tiered at Levels 3 and 4 entered the competition.

Calendar

Extra preliminary round
Matches played on weekend of Saturday 17 August 2001. 24 clubs from Level 8 and Level 9 of English football, entered at this stage of the competition, while other 303 clubs from levels 8-10 get a bye to the next rounds.

Preliminary round
Matches played on weekend of Saturday 1 September 2001. A total of 402 clubs took part in this stage of the competition, including the 12 winners from the Extra preliminary round, 302 clubs from Levels 8-10, who get a bye in the extra preliminary round and 88 entering at this stage from the four divisions at Level 7 of English football. The round featured three clubs from Level 10: Falmouth Town and St Blazey from the South Western Football League and Clevedon United from the Somerset Senior League, being the lowest ranked clubs in this round.

First qualifying round
Matches on weekend of 15 September 2001. A total of 202 clubs took part in this stage of the competition, 201 progressed from the preliminary round plus AFC Sudbury from the Eastern Counties Football League, who get a bye to this stage. Falmouth Town and St Blazey from the South Western Football League at Level 10 of English football were the lowest-ranked clubs to qualify for this round of the competition.

Second qualifying round
Matches played on weekend of 29 September 2001. A total of 168 clubs took part in this stage of the competition, including the 101 winners from the first qualifying round and 67 Level 6 clubs, from Premier divisions of the Isthmian League, Northern Premier League and Southern Football League, entering at this stage. The round featured St Blazey and Falmouth Town from the South Western Football League, being the lowest ranked clubs in this round. Also, eight clubs from Level 9 divisions were still in the competition.

Third qualifying round
Matches on weekend of 13 October 2001. A total of 84 clubs took part, all having progressed from the second qualifying round. St Blazey from the South Western Football League at Level 10 of English football was the lowest-ranked club to qualify for this round of the competition.

Fourth qualifying round
Matches played on weekend of Saturday 27 October 2001. A total of 64 clubs took part, 42 having progressed from the third qualifying round and 22 clubs from Football Conference, forming Level 5 of English football, entering at this stage. The round featured four clubs from Level 8 still in the competition, being the lowest ranked clubs in this round.

2001–02 FA Cup
See 2001–02 FA Cup for details of the rounds from the first round Proper onwards.

External links
 Football Club History Database: FA Cup 2001–02
 The FA Cup Archive

FA Cup qualifying rounds
Qual